STRV may refer to:
 Space Technology Research Vehicle, a series of British Earth-orbiting microsatellites
 STRV (company), a software company co-founded by Lubo Smid
Stratford virus, a virus in the Flavivirus genus
 Société de transports routiers de voyageurs, a French rail company, precursor of Keolis

See also
 Includes Swedish "Stridsvagn" tanks